D517 is a state road in Slavonia and Baranja regions of Croatia connecting D7 state road in Beli Manastir to D2 state road in Koška via Belišće and Valpovo.

The road, as well as all other state roads in Croatia, is managed and maintained by Hrvatske ceste, state owned company.

Traffic volume 

Traffic is regularly counted and reported by Hrvatske ceste, operator of the road.

Road junctions and populated areas

Sources

State roads in Croatia
Osijek-Baranja County